Alexander Mirtchev (April 28, 1957) is an American business executive, academic, author, and philanthropist working in the areas of global economic security, political risk analysis, and geo-economics. He is a vice chair of the Atlantic Council of the United States, member of the executive and strategy committees and the advisory council of the Scowcroft Center for Strategy and Security. Mirtchev is also a founding council member of the Kissinger Institute on China and the United States at the Woodrow Wilson International Center for Scholars, where he also served as a senior fellow and member of the Wilson National Cabinet. Mirtchev is also a distinguished visiting professor at George Mason University's Schar School of Government and Policy. He served as vice president of the Royal United Services Institute for Defense and Security Studies (RUSI), UK, as well as executive chairman of RUSI International. He is also the president and founder of Krull Corp., a macro-economic geopolitical consultancy. Mirtchev is a member of the James Madison Council of the Library of Congress. His new book, "The Prologue: The Alternative Energy Megatrend in the Age of Great Power Competition," is published in English, German, Spanish, and Russian.

Early life and education
Mirtchev earned an LLM in international and comparative law from George Washington University in 1992 and a PhD in philosophy from St. Kliment Ohridski University in 1983. In addition, he studied economics and finance at the London School of Economics and Harvard Business School, and Political Science at Boston University.

Academic life and public policy domain
Mirtchev currently serves as a distinguished visiting professor at the Schar School of Government and Policy at George Mason University. He is a vice chair of the Atlantic Council of the United States, where he also serves on the board of directors and the executive and strategy committees. He also serves on the advisory board to the Atlantic Council's Scowcroft Center for Strategy and Security. Mirtchev was a vice president of the Royal United Services Institute for Defense and Security (RUSI), a UK-based independent think tank on international defense and security policy, from 2010 to 2016 and was also the executive chairman of RUSI International.  He is a founding member of the council to the Kissinger Institute on China and the United States, established in 2008, at the Woodrow Wilson International Center for Scholars, where he also was a senior fellow. At the Wilson Center, Mirtchev also served on the Wilson National Cabinet from 2012 to 2017.  Mirtchev was also a professorial fellow and distinguished senior fellow at George Mason University's Schar School of Policy and Government. He has been a member of Friends of Fletcher Society at Tufts University since 2014. A student of ancient Greek philosophy and art, Mirtchev is an avid collector of Hellenistic Tanagra figurines.

Business life
Mirtchev is president of Krull Corp., a macroeconomic consultancy, which he founded in 1992. From 1993 to 1999 he worked as the director of the International Business and Investment Division at the Law Offices of Stewart & Stewart, Washington, D.C. In 2007, Mirtchev was appointed as an independent director and chairman of the Sustainable Development Fund 'Kazyna'. He also served as a  chairman of Global Options Management, a risk-mitigation services joint venture with GlobalOptions, a NASDAQ listed corporation, prior to it being acquired by Walker Digital, LLC.

Media and publications
Mirtchev is the author of the book “The Prologue: The Alternative Energy Megatrend in the Age of Great Power Competition” which analyzes the nexus between alternative energy, geopolitics, and national security. Mirtchev has also authored several monographs and policy articles, including “The Greening of Geopolitics," “Our Best New Foreign Policy Tool: Energy,"  and “La finance sur le sentier de la guerre,”  among others. Mirtchev has appeared as an analyst on BBC News, Reuters,  Bloomberg, CNBC, Al Jazeera English, Voice of America,  E&ETV, among other television news programs. He was a member of the Fox Business “Wall Street Week” Advisory Board. Currently he is a member of the editorial board of the Atlantic Council Strategy Papers.

References

Atlantic Council
Living people
American businesspeople
1957 births
21st-century American economists
Bulgarian emigrants to the United States
American male non-fiction writers